Cyclamen hederifolium, the ivy-leaved cyclamen or sowbread, is  a species of flowering plant in the family Primulaceae. This widespread cyclamen species is widely cultivated and among the most hardy and vigorous in oceanic climates. It is native to woodland, shrubland, and rocky areas in the Mediterranean region from southern France to western Turkey and on Mediterranean islands, and naturalized farther north in Europe and in the Pacific Northwest.

Names
The species name hederifolium comes from the Latin hedera (ivy) and folium (leaf), because of the shape and patterning of the leaves. The older species name, neapolitanum, refers to Naples, where the species grows.

Description

Cyclamen hederifolium is a tuberous perennial that blooms and sprouts leaves in autumn, grows through the winter, and goes dormant before summer, when the seed capsules ripen and open.

Tuber

The tuber is round-flattened and produces roots from the top and sides, leaving the base bare. In the florist's cyclamen (Cyclamen persicum), roots come from the bottom, leaving the top and sides bare.

Leaves and flowers grow from buds on the exposed upper surface of the tuber

Leaves
The leaves are variably shaped and colored. Depending on the specimen, leaf shape varies from heart-shaped to long and arrow-shaped, usually with 2-3 angled lobes on each side, resembling the juvenile leaves of ivy (Hedera). Leaf color varies from all-green to all-silver, but the most common is a Christmas tree or hastate pattern in silver or pewter and various shades of green.

The petiole and flower stalks of Cyclamen hederifolium grow outwards and then up, forming an "elbow". Plants in narrow pots often have a ring of leaves around the outside of the pot. From Latin, 'hederifolium' translates to Ivy-like leaves. In the closely related Cyclamen africanum, stalks grow up from the tuber without a bend near the base.

Flowers
The flowers bloom from late summer to autumn and have 5 petals, usually pink, purple, or white with a streaky magenta V-shaped marking on the nose, but sometimes pure white with no markings.

The edges of the petals near the nose of the flower are curved outwards into strong auricles. These are not present in some other species, such as Cyclamen persicum. The flowers are occasionally fragrant. The shape of the flower varies from long and thin to short and squat.

Fruit
After fertilization, the flower stem coils tightly, starting at the end, and rests above the tuber. Seeds are amber, held in a round pod, which opens by 5-10 flaps at maturity.

Cultivation

Cyclamen hederifolium is usually listed as the hardiest species of cyclamen. In oceanic climates, it self-seeds abundantly and will crowd out less vigorous species such as Cyclamen coum if the two are planted together. In cold continental climates such as Calgary, Alberta, where Cyclamen purpurascens grows well, it may not survive. DavesGarden.com lists it as hardy to zone 5a, although hardiness is dependent on presence of snow cover.

This plant has gained the Royal Horticultural Society's Award of Garden Merit (confirmed 2017).

Subdivisions

Varieties and forms

There are two varieties or subspecies (hederifolium and confusum), and var. hederifolium has two named forms, differentiated by leaf and flower characteristics.

 Cyclamen hederifolium var. hederifolium — leaves with well defined markings
 C. hederifolium var. hederifolium forma hederifolium — pink or purple flowers with darker markings at the base of the petals
 C. hederifolium var. hederifolium forma albiflorum — white flowers, sometimes with pale pink throat — this form has also won the RHS AGM  
 Cyclamen hederifolium var. confusum — fleshier leaves with poorly defined markings

The variety Cyclamen hederifolium var. poli, with long sagittate (arrowhead-shaped) leaves, is listed by the Pacific Bulb Society.

Cyclamen hederifolium var. confusum (C. confusum)
[[Image:Cyclamen hederifolium ssp confusum1.jpg|thumb|Cyclamen hederifolium var 'confusum''', now known as C. confusum, Osaka Prefectural Flowers Garden, Osaka, Japan]]
In chromosome count, var. confusum is tetraploid, while var. hederifolium is diploid.

Recently var. confusum has been elevated to the level of species as Cyclamen confusum, although this is not reflected on GRIN.

Cultivars
There are a number of cultivated varieties of Cyclamen hederifolium.Cyclamen hederifolium 'Amaze me', a cultivar with dark-pink flowers, is early bloomingCyclamen hederifolium 'Ruby Glow' has particularly deep all-magenta flowers.Cyclamen hederifolium'' 'Stargazer' has upward-facing flowers.

References

Notes

Sources
Cyclamen: a guide for gardeners, horticulturists, and botanists by C. Grey-Wilson (Google Books)

External links

Cyclamen Society
Pacific Bulb Society
CalPhotos

hederifolium